José Fuentes may refer to:

 José Luis Fuentes (born 1985), Venezuelan gymnast
 José Fuentes (judoka) (born 1960), Puerto Rican judoka
 José Francisco Fuentes (?–2009), Mexican politician
 Jose Dolores Fuentes, meteorologist at Pennsylvania State University